Brockton School' is an independent, co-educational school located in the Lynn Valley neighbourhood of the district municipality of North Vancouver, British Columbia, Canada. It comprises both a Junior and a Senior School, with students from Junior Kindergarten to grade 6 and grades 7 to 12 respectively.

About the School
Brockton School is a member of the International Baccalaureate Organization. It received authorization for the Primary Years Programme (PYP) in April 2008 and for the Middle Years Programme (MYP) in August 2009. Brockton is accredited by the Ministry of Education of British Columbia and is a member of the Federation of Independent School Associations of British Columbia.

References
 https://www.theglobeandmail.com/servlet/story/RTGAM.20071022.edu-parents-1022/BNStory/education/

External links
Brockton School website

Private schools in British Columbia
North Vancouver (district municipality)
International Baccalaureate schools in British Columbia
Educational institutions established in 2004
2004 establishments in British Columbia